This is the list of ministers who took oath after 14th Nagaland Assembly formed. Neiphiu Rio became head of the government.

Council of Ministers

Sources

Advisors

Sources

Demographics of Council of Ministers

References 

Lists of current Indian state and territorial ministries
Nationalist Democratic Progressive Party
Bharatiya Janata Party
2023 in Indian politics
Nagaland ministries
Cabinets established in 2023